Medjo Simon Loti Omossola (born 5 May 1998) is a Cameroonian professional footballer who plays as a goalkeeper for the Congolese club AS Vita.

International career
Omossola represented the Cameroon national team in a 2–1 friendly win over Zambia on 9 June 2019.

Honours

Cameroon 

 Third AFCON Tournament 2021-22.

References

External links

1998 births
Living people
Footballers from Yaoundé
Cameroonian footballers
Cameroon international footballers
Cameroon youth international footballers
Association football goalkeepers
Coton Sport FC de Garoua players
AS Vita Club players
Elite One players
Linafoot players
Cameroonian expatriate footballers
Cameroonian expatriates in the Democratic Republic of the Congo
Expatriate footballers in the Democratic Republic of the Congo
2021 Africa Cup of Nations players